Anderson Redding was the fourth superintendent of the Dahlonega Mint.

He became the fourth superintendent of the Dahlonega Mint in 1849 and remained in the position until 1853.

References

Mints of the United States
Georgia Gold Rush